Birgit Oline Kjerstad (born 11 September 1961) is a Norwegian politician.

She was elected representative to the Storting from the constituency of Møre og Romsdal for the period 2021–2025, for the Socialist Left Party.

References

1961 births
Living people
Socialist Left Party (Norway) politicians
Møre og Romsdal politicians
Members of the Storting
Women members of the Storting